Gustavo Oscar Benítez (born 7 March 1986) is an Argentine professional footballer who plays as a centre-back for Deportivo Riestra.

Career
Benítez started his senior career with Douglas Haig at the age of sixteen, appearing in Torneo Argentino A. Benítez had stints in 2004 and 2006 with lower-league duo Sportivo Las Heras and Colegiales, though returned to Douglas Haig either side of playing for them. 2007 saw Sarmiento sign Benítez. He'd leave the Primera B Nacional outfit a year later, signing for Juventud Pergamino in 2008. Twenty-seven appearances followed in the third tier. Benítez rejoined Sarmiento at the conclusion of 2008–09. He scored his first goal for the club in March 2010 versus Tristán Suárez. They won the 2011–12 title.

On 3 July 2013, Benítez was loaned to Almirante Brown of Primera B Nacional. His debut arrived on 13 August against Villa San Carlos, which preceded a further eight appearances. In June 2014, Benítez agreed a move to Estudiantes. He remained for the 2014 and 2015 campaigns, participating in forty-two league fixtures whilst netting goals against Fénix and Tristán Suárez. Deportivo Riestra became his eighth club in January 2016. Four goals in fifty-three encounters occurred in two seasons, with the latter ending with promotion to tier two. They were relegated in 2017–18; a campaign he ended with two red cards.

Career statistics
.

Honours
Sarmiento
Primera B Metropolitana: 2011–12

References

External links

1986 births
Living people
People from Pergamino
Argentine footballers
Association football defenders
Torneo Argentino A players
Primera B Metropolitana players
Primera Nacional players
Club Atlético Douglas Haig players
Club Atlético Sarmiento footballers
Juventud de Pergamino footballers
Club Almirante Brown footballers
Estudiantes de Buenos Aires footballers
Deportivo Riestra players
Sportspeople from Buenos Aires Province